Rybník is a village and municipality with 1420 inhabitants (as of December 31, 2020) in the Levice District in the Nitra Region of Slovakia.

History
In the Early Bronze Age, there was a fortified settlement on Mount Kusá hora, the remains of which have been examined annually since 2004 in a collaboration between the Slovak Archaeological Institute of the Slovak Academy of Sciences and the German RGK.

The place was first mentioned in writing in 1075 in the founding document of Hronský Beňadik Abbey as Sceulleus. The name refers to a centuries-long winemaking tradition. After the Mongol invasion, there was a reorganization of the ownership conditions, whereby the majority of the estate came to the Archdiocese of Gran and in 1776 changed to the newly created Diocese of Neusohl. In 1534 there were a total of 32 portahere, in modern times the village was a small town, which received market rights in 1781. In 1828 there were 134 houses and 943 inhabitants, most of whom were employed in agriculture.

Until 1918, the village in Perch county belonged to the Kingdom of Hungary and then came to Czechoslovakia and today Slovakia.

Geography
The community is located on the southwestern edge of the Štiavnica Mountains, where they merge into the Danube hills. The Hron flowing west of the village breaks through the foothills through the so-called Slovak Gate (Slovak Slovenská brána). The lower parts of the municipal area on the floodplains of the Hron are intensively used for agriculture, on the mountain slopes viticulture is practiced, while the mountains themselves are covered by oak forest. The town centre is located at an altitude of 205 meters above sea level and is two kilometres from Tlmače and ten kilometres from Levice.

Neighboring municipalities are Hronský Beňadik and Tekovská Breznica to the north, Čajkov to the east, Hronské Kosihy to the south, Veľké Kozmálovce to the southwest, Tlmače to the west and Kozárovce to the northwest.

Ethnicity
The village is approximately 98% Slovak.

Facilities
The village has a public library a gym and football pitch. It also has its own birth registry.

Notable people
Elmer Valo, baseball player

External links
http://www.statistics.sk/mosmis/eng/run.html

Villages and municipalities in Levice District